Sean Bennett may refer to:
 Sean Bennett (gridiron football)
 Sean Bennett (cyclist)
 Sean Bennett (politician)